The Brill Building is an office building at 1619 Broadway on 49th Street in the New York City borough of Manhattan, just north of Times Square and further uptown from the historic musical Tin Pan Alley neighborhood.

The Brill Building is famous for housing music industry offices and studios where some of the most popular American songs were written. It is considered to have been the center of the American music industry that dominated the pop charts in the early 1960s. The "Brill" name comes from a haberdasher who operated a store at street level and subsequently bought the building. The Brill Building was purchased by 1619 Broadway Realty LLC in June 2013 and underwent renovation during the 2010s. A CVS Pharmacy opened on the first two floors of the building in 2019.

Big band era
Before World War II, the Brill Building became a center of activity for the popular music industry, especially music publishing and songwriting. Scores of music publishers had offices in the Brill Building. Once songs had been published, the publishers sent song pluggers to the popular bands and radio stations. These song pluggers would sing and/or play the song for the band leaders to encourage bands to play their music.

During the ASCAP strike of 1941, many of the composers, authors and publishers turned to pseudonyms in order to have their songs played on the air.

Brill Building songs were constantly at the top of Billboard'''s Hit Parade and played by the leading bands of the day:
 The Benny Goodman Orchestra
 The Glenn Miller Orchestra
 The Jimmy Dorsey Orchestra
 The Tommy Dorsey Orchestra

Publishers included:
 Leo Feist Inc.
 Lewis Music Publishing
 Mills Music Publishing

Composers and lyricists included:

 Burt Bacharach
 Jeff Barry
 Bert Berns
 Bobby Darin
 Hal David
 Neil Diamond
 Luther Dixon
 Sherman Edwards
 Buddy Feyne
 Gerry Goffin
 Howard Greenfield
 Ellie Greenwich
 Jack Keller
 Carole King
 Jerry Leiber and Mike Stoller
 Barry Mann
 Johnny Mercer
 Rose Marie McCoy
 Van McCoy
 Irving Mills
 Fred Neil
 Laura Nyro
 Tony Orlando
 Doc Pomus
 Jerry Ragovoy
 Ben Raleigh
 Teddy Randazzo
 Billy Rose
 Neil Sedaka
 Mort Shuman
 Paul Simon (often under various pseudonyms)
 Cynthia Weil

 "Brill Building Sound"

The Brill Building's name has been widely adopted as a shorthand term for a broad and influential stream of American popular music (strongly influenced by Latin music, Traditional black gospel, and rhythm and blues) which enjoyed great commercial success in the late 1950s and throughout the 1960s. Many significant American and international publishing companies, music agencies, and record labels were based in New York, and although these ventures were naturally spread across many locations, the Brill Building was regarded as probably the most prestigious address in New York for music business professionals. The term "Brill Building Sound" is somewhat inaccurate, however, since much of the music so categorized actually emanated from other locations — music historian Ken Emerson nominated buildings at 1650 Broadway and 1697 Broadway as other significant bases of activity in this field.

By 1962, the Brill Building contained 165 music businesses. A musician could find a publisher and printer, cut a demo, promote the record and cut a deal with radio promoters, all within this one building. The creative culture of the independent music companies in the Brill Building and the nearby 1650 Broadway came to define the influential "Brill Building Sound" and the style of popular songwriting and recording created by its writers and producers.

Carole King described the atmosphere at the "Brill Building" publishing houses of the period:

The Brill Building approach—which can be extended to other publishers not based in the Brill Building—was one way that professionals in the music business took control of things in the time after rock and roll's first wave. In the Brill Building practice, there were no more unpredictable or rebellious singers; in fact, a specific singer in most cases could be easily replaced with another. These songs were written to order by pros who could custom fit the music and lyrics to the targeted teen audience. In a number of important ways, the Brill Building approach was a return to the way business had been done in the years before rock and roll, since it returned power to the publishers and record labels and made the performing artists themselves much less central to the music's production.

 Writers 
Many of the best works in this diverse category were written by a loosely affiliated group of songwriter-producer teams—mostly duos—that enjoyed immense success and who collectively wrote some of the biggest hits of the period. Many in this group were close friends and/or (in the cases of Goffin-King, Mann-Weil and Greenwich-Barry) married couples, as well as creative and business associates—and both individually and as duos, they often worked together and with other writers in a wide variety of combinations. Some (Carole King, Paul Simon, Burt Bacharach, Neil Sedaka, Neil Diamond, Boyce and Hart) recorded and had hits with their own music.

 Burt Bacharach and Hal David
 Bert Berns
 Otis Blackwell
 Sonny Bono
 Boyce and Hart
 Neil Diamond
 Sherman Edwards
 Tony Orlando
 Andy Kim
 David Gates
 Giant, Baum & Kaye
 Gerry Goffin and Carole King
 Ellie Greenwich and Jeff Barry
 Marvin Hamlisch
 Hugo Peretti and Luigi Creatore
 Kander and Ebb
 Artie Kornfeld
 Jerry Leiber and Mike Stoller
 Barry Mann and Cynthia Weil
 John Leslie McFarland
 Haras Fyre and Gwen Guthrie
 Shadow Morton
 Claus Ogerman
 Doc Pomus and Mort Shuman
 Tony Powers
 Beverly Ross
 Neil Sedaka and Howard Greenfield
 Paul Simon as Jerry Landis
 Phil Spector
 Eddie Snyder
 Bobby Susser
 Steve Tyrell

Other musicians who were headquartered in The Brill Building:

 Bobby Darin
 The Drifters featuring Ben E. King
 Connie Francis
 Lesley Gore
 Haras Fyre
 Darlene Love
 Liza Minnelli
 Donald Fagen and Walter Becker
 Gene Pitney
 The Ronettes
 The Shangri-Las
 The Shirelles
 The Sweet Inspirations
 Doris Troy
 Frankie Valli & The Four Seasons
 Dee Dee Warwick
 Dionne Warwick
 The Delicates

Among the hundreds of hits written by this group are "Maybe I Know" (Barry-Greenwich),  "Yakety Yak" (Leiber-Stoller), "Save the Last Dance for Me" (Pomus-Shuman), "The Look of Love" (Bacharach-David), "Breaking Up Is Hard to Do" (Sedaka-Greenfield), "Devil in Disguise" (Giant-Baum-Kaye), "The Loco-Motion" (Goffin-King), "Supernatural Thing" (Haras Fyre-Gwen Guthrie), "We Gotta Get Out of This Place" (Mann-Weil), and "River Deep, Mountain High" (Spector-Greenwich-Barry).

 Musicians 
The following is a partial list of studio musicians who contributed to the Brill Building sound:

 Arrangers/Conductors: Teacho Wiltshire, Garry Sherman, Alan Lorber, Jimmy Wisner, Artie Butler, Claus Ogerman, Stan Applebaum
 Bass: George Duvivier, Milt Hinton, Russ Savakus, Bob Bushnell, Joe Macho Jr, Al Lucas, Dick Romoff, James Tyrell, Jimmy Lewis, Lloyd Trotman, Wendell Marshall, Chuck Rainey
 Guitar: George Barnes, Al Gorgoni, Carl Lynch, Trade Martin, Bucky Pizzarelli, Everett Barksdale, Bill Suyker, Vinnie Bell, Al Caiola, Al Casamenti, Art Ryerson, Eric Gale, Ralph Casale, Charles Macey, Hugh McCracken, Wally Richardson, Don Arnone, Charles McCracken, Allan Hanlon, Sal Ditroia, Kenny Burrell, Mundell Lowe, Cornell Dupree, Mickey Baker
 Keyboards: Ernie Hayes, Paul Griffin, Leroy Glover, Frank Owens, Allan H. Nurse, Bernie Leighton, Artie Butler, Stan Free
 Drums: Gary Chester, Buddy Saltzman, Sticks Evans, Herbie Lovelle, Panama Francis, Al Rogers, Bobby Gregg, Sol Gubin, Bernard Purdie
 Saxophone: Artie Kaplan, Frank Heywood Henry, Phil Bodner, Jerome Richardson, Romeo Penque, King Curtis, Seldon Powell, Sam "the Man" Taylor, Buddy Lucas
 Trombone: Jimmy Cleveland, Frank Saracco, Benny Powell, Wayne Andre, Tony Studd, Micky Gravine, Urbie Green, Frank Rehak
 Trumpet: Jimmy Nottingham, Ernie Royal, Jimmy Maxwell, Bernie Glow, Irwin "Marky" Markowitz, Jimmy Sedlar, Dud Bascomb, Lammar Wright Jr, Burt Collins, Joe Shepley
 Percussion: George Devens, Phil Kraus, Bobby Rosengarden, Willie Rodriguez, Martin Grupp
 Engineers: Brooks Arthur, Eddie Smith,  Bruce Staple, Phil Ramone, Gordy Clark, Mickey Crofford, Tom Dowd, Bill MacMeekin, Ron Johnson.

 Aldon Music (1650 Broadway) 

Many of these writers came to prominence while under contract to Aldon Music, a publishing company founded in 1958 by industry veteran Al Nevins, and aspiring music entrepreneur Don Kirshner. Aldon was not initially located in the Brill Building, but rather, a block away at 1650 Broadway (at 51st Street). A number of Brill Building writers worked at 1650 Broadway, and the building continued to house record labels throughout the decades.

Toni Wine explains:

 Businesses at 1619 Broadway (Brill Building) and 1650 Broadway 
 1619 Broadway 

 Broadway Video
 Postworks LLC/Orbit Digital
 Famous Music
 Fiesta Records
 Coed Records, Inc.
 Mills Music
 Clock Records
 Southern Music
 Red Bird Records
 TM Music
 SoundOne (primarily film sound editing) and Sound Mixers (sound studio for jingles and music albums)
 Helios Music/Glamorous Music
 KMA Music
 New Vision Communications
 Paul Simon Music
 Key Brand Entertainment
 Maggie Vision Productions
 Alexa Management – President/CEO - Shafi Khan
 TSQ LLC
 Mission Big
 Studio Center

 1650 Broadway 

 Aldon Music
 Action Talents agency
 April/Blackwood Music
 Bang Records
 Bell Records, Inc.
 Buddah Records, Inc.
 Capezio Dance Theatre Shop
 Diamond Records
 Fling Music
 Gamble Records, Inc.
 H/B Webman & Co.
 Iridium Jazz Club
 Laurie Records
 Princess Music Publishing, Corp.
 Roulette Records
 Scepter Records
 Wand Records
 Web IV Music, Inc.
 We Three Music Publishing, Inc.
 Just Sunshine Records
 Allegro Sound Studios (later called Generation Sound Studios)
 Roosevelt Music

 In popular culture 
The 1996 film Grace of My Heart is in part a fictionalized account of the life in the Brill Building. Illeana Douglas plays a songwriter loosely based on Carole King. Similarly, Broadway musical Beautiful depicts King's early career, including her songwriting at 1650 Broadway.

In Sweet Smell of Success, J.J. Hunsecker and his sister Susie live on one of the upper floors of the Brill Building. The title of the 2014 New Pornographers power pop album Brill Bruisers is a reference to the 1960s-era Brill Building studio sound. In the HBO series Vinyl, the fictitious record label American Century is headquartered in the Brill Building.

Jack Dempsey's Broadway Restaurant was located in the Brill Building's first floor on Broadway.

It features in several episodes of the Broadway themed NBC musical drama Smash.

Stephin Merritt makes reference to the Brill Building on the Magnetic Fields' "Epitaph For My Heart" from their 1999 release 69 Love Songs.

Renovations and current use
The New York City Landmarks Preservation Commission (LPC) designated the Brill Building as a landmark in December 2010.

In 2017, musician Jimmy Buffett's hospitality company considered the building for a Margaritaville restaurant. The deal fell through when CVS Pharmacy leased some of that space instead. The CVS opened in 2019. In 2020, the LPC approved a proposal by Bruno Kearney Architects to add LED signs to the Brill Building's facade and modify a ground-floor storefront for TD Bank.

 See also 
 National Register of Historic Places listings in Manhattan from 14th to 59th Streets
 List of New York City Designated Landmarks in Manhattan from 14th to 59th Streets

 References 
 Notes 

 Sources 
 Emerson, Ken (2005). Always Magic in the Air: The Bomp and Brilliance of the Brill Building Era. Viking Penguin. . Reviewed by The New York Times'' here 'Always Magic in the Air': Leaders of the Pack.
 Postal, Matthew A. (2010). "The Brill Building" (designation report). New York: Landmarks Preservation Commission. LP-2387.
 Scheurer, Timothy E., American Popular Music: The Age of Rock, Bowling Green State University, Popular Press, 1989. Cf. especially pp. 76, 125.

Further reading 
 AOL Music—Pop Artists in the Brill Building
 Interview with Toni Wine, Songfacts
 Regarding Claus Ogerman & his music publishing companies located at The Brill Building
 Brill Building Is Named a Landmark
  "Half Empty but Full of History, Brill Building Seeks Tenants", New York Times, 24 July 2013

External links 

 

Art Deco architecture in Manhattan
Broadway (Manhattan)
Office buildings completed in 1931
Music of New York City
New York City Designated Landmarks in Manhattan
Office buildings in Manhattan
Randy Newman
Theater District, Manhattan